Battle Tanks (or Tank Battles outside of North America) is a multidirectional shooter developed and published by Gameloft for the PlayStation 3. It was released on the PlayStation Store on September 3, 2009.

The game can be played offline or online with humans or bot opponents. It also contains multiple maps and skins. In-Game purchases.

References

2009 video games
Multidirectional shooters
PlayStation 3 games
PlayStation 3-only games
PlayStation Network games
Tank simulation video games
Video games developed in Canada
Gameloft games
Multiplayer and single-player video games